John Kuzman (June 29, 1915January 29, 2008) was an American football tackle who played in the National Football League.

College career
Kuzman was a three year starter at tackle for the Fordham Rams. He played in the first televised football game in 1939 as a junior.

Professional career
Kuzman was drafted by the Chicago Cardinals in the seventh round of the 1941 NFL Draft. He played one season with the team before joining the Navy after the outbreak of WWII. He was assigned to the Pre-Flight training program at Saint Mary's College of California, where he served as a physical training instructor. Kuzman later was assigned to North Carolina Pre-Flight, where Ted Williams was among the pilot trainees. After the war Kuzman was signed by the San Francisco 49ers and played in the team's inaugural season. He joined the Chicago Rockets, reuniting with former Fordham head coach Jim Crowley, for 1947. Kuzman played for the Jersey City Giants of the minor league American Football League in 1948 and 1949.

Later life and death
Kuzman married Audrey on September 3, 1941. In 1947, Kuzman joined San Francisco State College as a member of the Physical Education Department, before coming to the same role at Rutgers University the following year. He joined the faculty at Saint Michaels High School in Union County, New Jersey, in 1950. Kuzman coached and taught at Bloomfield High School from 1952 to 1954. Between 1954 and 1974 he was a teacher and coach at Bergen County Vocational and Technical High School. Kuzman died on January 29, 2008, at the NJ Firemen’s Home in Boonton, New Jersey.

References

External links
Fordham Athletic Hall of Fame profile

1915 births
2008 deaths
Players of American football from Pennsylvania
American football tackles
Fordham Rams football players
San Francisco 49ers players
Chicago Cardinals players
Chicago Rockets players
United States Navy personnel of World War II